Cyclorhipidion is a genus of beetles belonging to the family Curculionidae.

The genus has almost cosmopolitan distribution.

Species:
 Cyclorhipidion agnaticeps Wood & Bright, 1992 
 Cyclorhipidion agnatum Wood & Bright, 1992

References

Curculionidae
Curculionidae genera